Heiner Baltes (born 19 August 1949 in Erkrath-Unterbach, West Germany) is a German retired footballer who played as a defender. He spent his whole 11-year career with Fortuna Düsseldorf, playing 279 league games.

References

External links
 

Living people
1949 births
German footballers
Germany B international footballers
Germany under-21 international footballers
Association football defenders
Bundesliga players
Fortuna Düsseldorf players
Footballers at the 1972 Summer Olympics
Olympic footballers of West Germany
West German footballers
Footballers from Düsseldorf